Nationality words link to articles with information on the nation's poetry or literature (for instance, Irish or France).

Works published

United Kingdom
 Isaac Bickerstaffe, Leucothoe, published anonymously
 Francies Brooke, Virginia: A tragedy, a drama that contains poems
 Richard Owen Cambridge, An Elegy Written in an Empty Assembly Room, a parody of Alexander Pope's Eloisa to Abelard
 Thomas Cole, The Arbour; or, The Rural Philosopher, published anonymously
 William Kenrick, Epistles to Lorenzo, published anonymously
 William Mason, Odes
 Edward Moore, Poems, Fables and Plays
 Christopher Pitt, Poems [...] Together with The Jordan, "By the celebrated translator of Virgil's Aeneid", according to the book
 Christopher Smart:
 Hymn to the Supreme Being
 Translator, The Works of Horace (see also Works of Horace, Translated into Verse 1767)
 Joseph Warton, An Essay on the Writings and Genius of Pope, Volume 1 (Volume 2 published in 1782), criticism

English, Colonial America
 Jacob Duche, "Pennsylvania: A Poem", English, Colonial America
 Samuel Tilden, Tilden's Miscellaneous Poems, on Divers Occasions, Chiefly to Animate and Rouse the Soldiers, English, Colonial America, posthumously published

Other
 Solomon Gessner, Switzerland, German-language:
 Idyllen, versions of the work eventually appeared in English, Dutch, Portuguese, Spanish, Swedish and Czech (see also a second volume of Idyllen 1772)
 Inkel und Yanko, a reworked story borrowed from The Spectator (No. 11, March 13, 1711)
 Voltaire, Poème sur le désastre de Lisbonne ("Poem on the Lisbon Disaster"), on the 1755 Lisbon earthquake; 180 lines, composed in December, 1755; France

Births
Death years link to the corresponding "[year] in poetry" article:
 April – William Gifford (died 1826), English satiric poet and literary editor
 July 25 (probable year) – Elizabeth Hamilton (died 1816), Irish-born Scottish essayist, poet and novelist
 November 13 – Edward Rushton (died 1814), English poet, bookseller and abolitionist

Deaths
Birth years link to the corresponding "[year] in poetry" article:
 March 26 – Gilbert West (born 1703), English poet
 c. April 1 – Stephen Duck (born 1705), English "thresher poet", by suicide
 Frehat Bat Avraham, Jewish Poet

See also

Poetry
List of years in poetry

Notes

18th-century poetry
Poetry